Poggibonsi is a town in the province of Siena, Tuscany, central Italy. It is located on the river Elsa and is the main centre of the Valdelsa Valley.

History
The area around Poggibonsi was already settled in the Neolithic age, although the first traces of civilisation dates from Etruscan-Roman age, attested by a series of necropolises and by placenames such as "Talciona" or "Marturi" (from the Etruscan name of Mars).

The importance of the area dates from the 10th century, thanks to its position across the Via Francigena, the main road from Rome to France. At that time, the development of Borgo di Marte (later Marturi, Borgo Vecchio and then Poggibonsi) was started, a settlement whose origins are debated. Around 1010, Borgo di Camaldo appeared. In 1155 or 1156, the inhabitants of these and other nearby towns were moved by Guido Guerra, of the Guidi Counts, to a hill where a new settlement, Poggiobonizio, was established. In the 12th century, the Cathars had a major theological school in Poggibonsi.  Declared an Imperial City by emperor Frederick II, according to Giovanni Villani it was one of the most beautiful cities in Italy. Poggiobonizio, which adhered to the Ghibellines, was destroyed by the Florentine Guelphs in 1270. After 1293, Poggibonsi remained under Florentine rule. Emperor Henry VII ordered reconstruction in 1313 as Monte Imperiale, but the work did not survive him. In 1484, Lorenzo de' Medici had a new settlement built in Poggiobonizio according to the Renaissance idea of the "Ideal City", protected by a fortress designed by Antonio and Giuliano da Sangallo. Work, however, was halted in 1510.

After a short period under the French in the early 19th century, it became part of a united Italy in 1861. In the 20th century, the economy was based on the trade in Chianti wine and active industrialisation. Poggibonsi is the smallest of the Chianti Classico sub-regions.

Main sights
The Palazzo Pretorio (late 13th century), with the annexed Torre del Podestà was the seat of the local government until the construction of the Palazzo Comunale in the 19th century. The lower floor, with the loggia, is  travertine, while the upper section is brick and travertine. Since 1997, it has housed a palaeontological museum.
The Church of San Lorenzo, built by the Augustinian order in Gothic-Romanesque style. In 1495, it was the seat of the meeting between Charles VIII of France and Girolamo Savonarola. The interior houses a painting by Neri di Bicci of St. Nicholas, a 14th-century wooden crucifix by Giovanni d'Agostino and a painting of the Madonna delle Grazie.
Santuario del Romituzzo: 15th-century oratory-sanctuary with campanile and portico housing a venerated image of the Madonna della Neve (Madonna of the Snows). The second story is rich with ex voto offerings.

In the neighbourhood are:

Basilica of San Lucchese: Large Gothic church, built around 1252 over a pre-existing church of San Camaldo, traces of which can be seen in the façade and left wall. It is located on a hill near the city. The chapel apse was built in the 14th century, while the portico is 17th century. The interior houses a terracotta statue of the Immaculate Conception by Giovanni della Robbia, frescoes by Bartolo di Fredi, Taddeo Gaddi, Cennino Cennini and Arturo Agliardi. The remains of San Lucchese, patron saint of Poggibonsi, are in the eponymous chapel. The adjoining convent's refectory has a fresco by Gerino da Pistoia.
The Fonte delle Fate ("Fairies' Spring") is one of the few remains of the destroyed Poggiobonizio, from the early 13th century. It was discovered in 1803.
Castello della Magione, once home of the Knights Templars, and then given to the Knights Hospitallers after the Templars were abolished in 1312, is on the Via Francigena. The small church has a single nave ending with a noteworthy apse. The complex is currently the headquarters of the Militia Templi.
In the frazione of Staggia Senese is a castle (Rocca), probably dating from Lombard times, which belonged to the Florentine family of the Franzesi from the 13th century. A museum (known as the littlest in the world) in the village houses an important work by Antonio del Pollaiuolo, the Santa Maria Egiziaca, as well as other panels from the 14th and 15th centuries.
Castello di Strozzavolpe ("Castle of the Fox-Strangler") is an ancient fortress of the Guidi family. According to legend, it was connected to Poggibonizio by a tunnel.
San Martino a Luco: Romanesque Pieve church.
The Church of Sant'Andrea a Palapiano, one of the most notable Romanesque edifices in the area. Although known from before the 11th century, the current building dates from the 13th century.
Santa Maria a Talciona: 12th-13th century church with bas-relief (1234) in portal portraying the Adoration of the Magi.
San Lorenzo in Pian de' Campi: church houses a 15th-century fresco by Pier Francesco Fiorentino.
The Magione di Torri was a castle of the Hospitallers built in the early 11th century.
Pieve of San Pietro a Cedda: Romanesque Pieve church located kilometres from Poggibonsi's centre. It is an abbey-like building with a noteworthy apse and a large bell tower. The complex decoration of the portals and windows is also significant. The interior has a tabernacle attributed to Mino da Fiesole. It once housed also a 14th-century triptych of the Florentine School, now in the town museum of Colle.

Frazioni
The municipality is formed by the city of Poggibonsi and the towns and villages (frazioni) of Bellavista and Staggia Senese. Other notable villages include Case Bolzano, Castiglioni, Cedda, Cinciano, Gavignano, Lecchi di Staggia, Luco, Montemorli, Papaiano, Piandicampi, Sant'Antonio del Bosco and Talciona.

International relations

 
Poggibonsi is twinned with:
 Corleto Perticara, Italy
 Werne, Germany
 Marcq-en-Barœul, France

Popular culture
"Poggibonsi" is also the title of a song written by Franco Battiato, and sung by Milva in her 1982 album Milva e dintorni.

Sports
The local football team is U.S. Poggibonsi.

People
Niccolò da Poggibonsi, monk
Alberto Bettiol, professional cyclist
Riccardo "Reynor" Romiti, professional gamer

References

Sources

Castles in Italy